Alien Beat Club (often abbreviated as ABC) were a Danish pop/R&B group, best known as second-place winners on Series 2 of The X Factor. Its members - Kasper Spring Ehlers, Marcel Mark Gbekle, Patricia Namakula Mbabazi and Stephanie Lykkehøj Gudmundsen - had originally auditioned as solo artists at the beginning of the competition, but were later formed into a band by judge/mentor Remee.

X Factor 

Prior to joining Alien Beat Club, Kasper had been a finalist in Idols, Patricia was a customer service representative for Telia, Stephanie was a singer/songwriter in another band, and Marcel was a football player.

After X Factor
Alien Beat Club released the single "My Way", in weeks 38/2009, which went to number one on Tracklisten, the official Danish Singles Chart. They have also released a charity single "It's My World", in support of UNICEF.

Discography

Albums

Singles

References

X Factor (Danish TV series) contestants
Danish pop music groups
Musical groups established in 2009